Dendrolobium baccatum is a species of flowering plants in the Fabaceae family. A shrub, it occurs in Mainland Southeast Asia. People use it for food and fuel.

Description
This plant grows as a shrub some 1 to 2m tall. It flowers in October and November, fruits in December and January and can possess leaves all year round (becoming deciduous during prolonged dry periods).

Distribution
This species is found in Thailand, Cambodia, Vietnam and Laos.

Habitat
D. baccatum is occurs in open and wet forests on peaty, clayey soils, and in scrub up to 900m elevation. On islands of the Mekong river in Kratié and Stung Treng provinces, Cambodia, the shrub is medium abundant in Deciduous forest with bamboo and Mixed evergreen forest formations. It grows there on soils derived from a metamorphic sandstone bedrock, at 25 to 30m elevation.

Vernacular names
The shrub is called trônum bangkuëy (="habitat of lizards") in Khmer.

Uses
The young fruit of the plant are edible, the wood makes excellent firewood.

References

baccatum
Desmodieae
Flora of Cambodia
Flora of Laos
Flora of Thailand
Flora of Vietnam
Plants described in 1924